The Royal Military College Saint-Jean, commonly referred to as RMC Saint-Jean and CMR, is a Canadian military college and university. It is located on the historical site of Fort Saint-Jean, in Saint-Jean-sur-Richelieu, Quebec, 40 km south of Montreal. RMC Saint-Jean is an arm of the Canadian Military College (CMC) system that provides two college-level programs in Social Science and Science, which are closely integrated with the undergraduate programs offered by the Royal Military College of Canada. RMC Saint-Jean was granted independent university status in 2021, and it currently offers a bachelor's degree in International Studies.

Responsibilities 
 Conduct of the Preparatory Year academic activities, under the functional authority of RMC, as well as military and fitness training and bilingualism.
 Provision of oversight, under the functional authority of RMC, of the Continuing Studies and Officer Professional Military Education programs.

Program 

Intended for students who have obtained their high-school certificates in Quebec or the equivalent elsewhere in Canada, the programs offered at RMC Saint-Jean prepare students to pursue university studies in one of the programs offered at the Royal Military College of Canada in Kingston, Ontario, or in the International Studies program offered at RMC Saint-Jean.

Military education for Canadian officers is focused on the four pillars of achievement unique to the military colleges: the military, physical fitness, bilingualism, and academics.

About 325 students per year receive training at RMC Saint-Jean in the two-year pre-university programs leading to a college diploma or in the International Studies program leading to a baccalaureate:
 110–120 cadets in the Preparatory Year
 130–140 in First Year
15-25 in Second Year
15-25 in Third Year
15-25 in Fourth Year

In some instances, RMC Saint-Jean allows Quebecers who have already completed a year of studies at the college level to be admitted directly into First Year.

In preparation for continued university studies at RMC, or RMC Saint-Jean should they choose the International Studies program, students select either the Social Science program (students pursuing a degree in Arts) or the Science program (students pursuing a degree in Engineering or Science). Each program is offered in both official languages. The two programs share core courses: four in literature; three in philosophy; two in Second Language; three in Physical Education. These core courses are supplemented with courses specific to each program. RMC Saint-Jean offers courses in both official languages.

Divided into two semesters, the academic year is composed of 150 teaching days and a final examination period, followed by a supplemental examination period.

Academics 

The core courses in both programs include: literature, humanities, second language, and physical education.

The mandate of the preparatory year is to develop in its students good work habits, academic diligence, critical facility, and team spirit.

Regular Officer Training Program 

Officer and Naval Cadets at RMCSJ are eligible for the Regular Officer Training Program. This program is designed for officer candidates to obtain a bachelor degree (which is required to be an officer in the Canadian Armed Forces) while attending either the Royal Military College in Saint-Jean or the Royal Military College of Canada in Kingston, Ontario. For certain degrees, it is possible to do ROTP through a civilian university if it is not offered at one of the military colleges.

Uniforms 

Cadets wear a variety of uniforms depending on the occasion and their environment: ceremonial dress (semi ceremonial); full dress (formal occasions); outside sports dress; service dress Air Force; service dress Navy; service dress Navy without jacket; Service dress Air Force without jacket; service dress Army without jacket; and combat dress.

In winter 2009, Royal Military College officer cadets returned to wearing a distinctive Dress of the Day (DOD) uniform which consists of a white shirt, black sweater/light jacket, as well as black trousers/skirt with a red stripe down the side. The headdress is a black wedge with red piping.

Mess dress is worn in the Senior Staff Mess for formal occasions such as mess dinners.

Positions of responsibility 
To further OCdt and NCdt leadership skills and abilities, cadets are appointed to positions of responsibility according to merit or a need for development. Each cadet wears 1-5 of bars to indicate authority. An appointment typically last a semester.

Awards 
Awards are granted to outstanding cadets:

Centres

Canadian Forces Management Development School (CFMDS) 
Founded in 1966, the mission of the CFMDS is to apply management and leadership training and consultation to the defence team. The CFMDS is housed at the RMC Saint-Jean.

Non-Commissioned Members Professional Development Centre (NCMPDC) 
The NCMPDC was created on 1 April 2003 and is located at Campus Saint-Jean. The courses that are offered at the centre are the Intermediate Leadership Qualification (ILQ), the Advanced Leadership Qualification (ALQ) and finally the CPO1/CWO Chief Qualification (CQ). All courses include both distance learning and a residential portion. The distance learning portion lasts 9 or 10 weeks depending on the course and allows the candidates to remain with their respective units. These courses also prepare the candidates for the residential portion which last three weeks and takes place on the RMC Saint-Jean site.

The NCMPDC courses were created as a result of the NCM Corps 2020, which is the strategic guidance for the professional development of the Canadian Forces Non-Commissioned Members.

More than a thousand members of the Canadian Forces transit through the NCMPDC each year to perfect their knowledge and skills following or before their promotion to the ranks of warrant officer (petty officer first class), master warrant officer (chief petty officer second class) or chief warrant officer (chief petty officer first class).

The NCMPDC is a unique professional education establishment within the CF. It is the only pan-CF school that is for NCM's taught by NCM's and as of September 2007 commanded by an NCM.

Since May 2009, NCMPDC is under the command of the Canadian Forces College (CFC) in Toronto, which offers a similar professional development curriculum but for officers from the ranks of major to brigadier general.

On 20 April 2012, the auditorium at the Non-Commissioned Members Professional Development Centre (NCMPDC) was named after Chief Warrant Officer Robert Girouard, MSC who was the first Regimental Sergeant Major in the 123-year history of the Royal Canadian Regiment to be killed by enemy action; He was previously stationed in Germany, Kosovo, Bosnia and Afghanistan.

Squadrons of the Cadet Wing 

The undergraduate body, known as the Cadet Wing, is subdivided into three smaller groupings called Squadrons, under the guidance and supervision of senior cadets. The squadrons are currently named in honour of local communities that take their name from historical figures of New France. Squadrons are subdivided into flights and sections. In 2017, another squadron was added named Jolliet. These squadrons have a competition called the "Commandants Cup" which is a competition in the four pillars of the college.

In the 1960s, the three squadrons were named Cartier, Maisonneuve and Champlain in honour of historical figures.

Routine 

When they arrive at the Officer Cadets Division, the officer cadets have already chosen their service. They are soon separated into four squadrons (Richelieu, Iberville, Tracy, or Jolliet).

The pre-university program features modern, diversified teaching methods: workshops, introduction to research methods, laboratories, group projects, oral and multimedia presentations. The staff provide academic support in the form of workshops, tutorials, and supplementary courses.

The cadets live in the Cartier Building or the Champlain Building and eat in the Dextraze Pavilion (completed in 1993). The cadets cannot leave the campus except on weekends. However, some weekends are used for military training.

During the week, the daily routine consists of inspection, running, breakfast, classes, sports, and studies. The officer cadets attend academic classes and undergo military training. The military training is in the form of drill, cartography, compass use, and two major field exercises each year. The cadets can take roles as cadet squadron leader, deputy cadet squadron leader, cadet flight leader and section commander. Outside classes, bilingualism is promoted by French / English weeks.

On the weekend, with the exception of military training, the students are largely free.

History 

In the fall of 2007, the federal government reopened the military college at Saint-Jean. The military college was slated for closure in 1995, but on 9 July 1994, the federal and provincial governments agreed to maintain it as a non-degree-granting college.

The reopened RMC Saint-Jean greatly differs from the original college which opened in 1952 and from the RMC of Canada located in Kingston. The new RMC Saint-Jean encompasses the Canadian Forces Management and Development School, one of the oldest CF training establishments in the country. It is also the home to the Non-Commissioned Member Professional Development Centre, which develops the prospective future senior leaders of the Canadian Forces NCM Corps.

Michaëlle Jean, Governor General of Canada, inaugurated the Royal Military College Saint-Jean on 24 May 2008, and she presented the new college coat of arms to the commandant, Colonel François Pion.

The Commandant of Royal Military College Saint-Jean reports to the Commander, Canadian Defence Academy (CDA). RMC Saint-Jean also has its own board of governors. Cadets at RMC Saint-Jean are issued scarlet uniforms. The first-year program at RMC Saint-Jean is freeing up beds at RMC allowing more Regular Officer Training Program (ROTP) cadets to attend RMC rather than civilian universities.

Features and buildings 

Richelieu, Jolliet, Tracy and Iberville Squadrons live in the Cartier and Champlain Blocks. The Vanier, DeLéry, Dextraze, Lahaie and Massey Pavillons along with the Old Mess are shared. The campus provides technological support: library, laboratories, learning materials, and Internet access. RMC Saint-Jean infrastructure is currently used by the Canadian Forces located at ASU Saint-Jean and by a non-profit corporation called Campus du Fort Saint-Jean (Quebec), which arranges for the upkeep of many of the educational facilities and leases them out to educational institutions such as the Université du Québec à Montréal (UQAM) for their local program while also renting out others for short events such as large banquets or conventions.
The Register of the Government of Canada Heritage Buildings lists six recognized Federal Heritage Buildings on the Royal Military College Saint-Jean grounds:

Museum 

The museum is located in Fort Saint-Jean on the campus of the Collège militaire royal de Saint-Jean. The museum's mandate is to collect, conserve, research and display material relating to the history of the CMR, its former cadets and its site, Saint-Jean-sur-Richelieu. Guided tours are offered. The museum contains collections of military memorabilia, military artefacts, maps, models, videos and historical objects. The site has been occupied since 1666 by different garrisons, a shipyard and a military college.
The CMR Ex-Cadet Foundation manages the museum which recognizes more than 325 years (1666–1995) of military history at the fortifications located on the Richelieu River. The flora and centenary trees enhance the site. The RMC Saint-Jean art collection includes a bronze sculpture of a cadet 'Truth Duty Valour (1976)', by William McElcheran (Canadian 1927–1999) "Presented to ‘Le Collège Militaire Royal de Saint-Jean’ by the commandant, staff & cadets of R.M.C., Canada on the occasion of the sister College's visit, 12–17 May 1976".

The museum club began as a club for cadets in 1972 with the head of the museum club serving as curator. Officer Cadets were part of the team that converted the old guard house into a proper museum. Office Cadets designed diorama(s) used in the museum and the business card from the museum featured a picture of one of the officer cadet's model soldiers on it.

The museum was closed from 1998 to 2003. The Museum Committee of the CMR Ex-Cadet Club Foundation was founded on 22 January 2003. When the museum was accredited a Canadian Forces Museum, the Museum Committee became an independent entity separate from the Foundation.

In 2006, while Hélène Ladouceur served as curator, the museum site moved from the old guardhouse to the entrance of the former Protestant Chapel. LGen (ret.) and Senator Roméo A. Dallaire presided over the official opening, which took place on 29 March 2006.

Eric Ruel became the museum curator in 2006. The museum website museedufortsaintjean.ca was created in June 2007.

In May 2012, while Eric Ruel served as curator, the museum relocated to the historical pavilion "les Forges". The museum is open Wednesday to Sunday, from 10:00 to 17:00, from 24 May until 1 September.

Archaeology digs have taken place on the site from 2009 to 2013 through the Quebec Archaeo Month, an initiative of Archéo-Québec. Funded by the Directorate of History and Heritage of the Canadian Forces as part of a five-year agreement between the Fort Saint-Jean Museum, Laval University and the Royal Military College Saint-Jean, the Archaeology Digs are supported by the Corporation du Fort Saint-Jean and archaeologists from Parks Canada. The museum is a member of the Canadian Museums Association, Canadian Heritage Information Network (CHIN), Virtual Museum of Canada and the Organization of Military Museums of Canada Inc. The museum is an accredited museum within the Canadian Forces Museum System. The museum has formed a cooperating association of friends of the museum to assist with projects.

Memorials

Plaques

Naval, military, and air memorials

Commandants 
With college numbers and rank held as commandant

Notable people 

 Charles H. Belzile
 Jean Berthiaume
 François Bonnardel
 Jennie Carignan
 Roméo Dallaire
 Joseph A. Day

Hall of Fame 
Royal Military College Saint-Jean inaugurated its Hall of Fame on 7 September 2013. Potential candidates must have studied at, been employed as a member of the faculty or staff at, or have had a notable involvement with Royal Military College Saint-Jean over the course of its existence since 1952. The Hall of Fame contributors include the Collège militaire royal de Saint-Jean Ex-Cadet Foundation, the Class of 1963 and the Fort Saint-Jean Branch of the RMC Club.

Alumni 

Shown with college numbers.

Faculty. 

 Roch Carrier, author of Le Chandail de hockey or The Hockey Sweater, and later National Librarian of Canada.
 Janine Krieber, wife of former Liberal Party leader Stéphane Dion.

In fiction and popular culture 
The College's central place in Canadian military circles has made it the setting for novels, plays, films and other cultural works.
 4377 Lt. Gen. Richard J. Evraire, CD (CMR/RMC 1959) wrote the play Chambre 204 (Saint-Jean-Sur-Richelieu: Editions Mille Roches, 1982) inspired by his time at the Royal Military College Saint-Jean.

Coat of arms and flag

Books 
 H15198 Dr. Jacques Castonguay "Pourquoi a-t-on fermé le Collège militaire de Saint-Jean?" Montreal, Art Global, 2005
 H15198 Dr. Jacques Castonguay "Le Collège militaire royal de Saint-Jean" Meridien 1989
 H15198 Dr. Jacques Castonguay "Le Collège militaire royal de Saint-Jean: une université à caractère différent" Septentrion, 1992 , 9782921114783
 H15198 Jacques Castonguay "The unknown Fort, Editions du Levrier" 1966
 H15198 Jacques Castonguay "Le Defile 1952–1972 College Militaire Royal de St Jean 20th Anniversary Yearbook" 1972
 H15198 Jacques Castonguay "Les defies du Fort Saint-Jean, Editions du Richelieu" 1975
 Peter J.S. Dunnett, "Royal Roads Military College 1940–1990, A Pictorial Retrospective" (Royal Roads Military College, Victoria, British Columbia, 1990)
 4377 Colonel Richard J. Evraire, CD (CMR/RMC 1959) "Chambre 204" (Saint-Jean-Sur-Richelieu: Editions Mille Roches, 1982)
 Jean-Yves Gravel. "La fondation du Collège militaire royale de Saint Jean." Revue d'histoire de l'amérique française 27, no. 2 (sept. 1973).
 H16511 Dr. Richard A. Preston "To Serve Canada: A History of the Royal Military College since the Second World War", Ottawa, University of Ottawa Press, 1991.
 H16511 Dr. Richard A. Preston, "Canada's Royal Military College: A History of the Royal Military College" Toronto, University of Toronto Press, 1969.
 4669 Toivo Roht (CMR RMC 1960) "Collège militaire royal de Saint-Jean, Royal Roads Military College and Royal Military College of Canada 1955–2006" 2007
 H1877 R. Guy C. Smith (editor) "As You Were! Ex-Cadets Remember" In 2 Volumes. Volume I: 1876–1918. Volume II: 1919–1984. Royal Military College of Canada Kingston, Ontario. The Royal Military Colleges Club of Canada 1984

See also 
 Canadian Military Colleges
 Royal Military College of Canada
 Royal Roads Military College
 Royal Naval College of Canada
 Canadian Interuniversity Sport
 Canadian government scientific research organizations
 Canadian university scientific research organizations
 Canadian industrial research and development organizations

References

External links 
 
 
 Fondation des Anciens du CMR de Saint-Jean (in French)

 
Canadian Armed Forces
Military academies of Canada
Colleges in Quebec
College
Organizations based in Canada with royal patronage
Educational institutions established in 1876
Educational institutions established in 1952
Naval academies
Air force academies
University museums in Canada
Military and war museums in Canada
Museums in Montérégie
Buildings and structures in Saint-Jean-sur-Richelieu
Tourist attractions in Montérégie
Education in Saint-Jean-sur-Richelieu
Military education and training in Canada
1952 establishments in Quebec